"Kling, Glöckchen", or "Ring, Little Bell", is a German Christmas carol from the 19th century.

Melody

Lyrics 
Kling, Glöckchen, klingelingeling,
kling, Glöckchen, kling!
Laßt mich ein, ihr Kinder,
ist so kalt der Winter,
öffnet mir die Türen,
laßt mich nicht erfrieren!
Kling, Glöckchen, klingelingeling,
kling, Glöckchen, kling!

Kling, Glöckchen, klingelingeling,
Kling, Glöckchen, kling!
Mädchen, hört, und Bübchen,
macht mir auf das Stübchen,
bring euch viele Gaben,
sollt euch dran erlaben.
Kling, Glöckchen, klingelingeling,
kling, Glöckchen, kling!

Kling, Glöckchen, klingelingeling,
kling, Glöckchen, kling!
Hell erglühn die Kerzen,
öffnet mir die Herzen!
Will drin wohnen fröhlich,
frommes Kind, wie selig.
Kling, Glöckchen, klingelingeling,
kling, Glöckchen, kling!
Ring, little bell, ringalingaling,
Ring, little bell, ring!
Let me in, you kids,
So cold is the winter,
Open the doors for me,
Don't let me freeze!
Ring, little bell, ringalingaling,
Ring, little bell, ring!

Ring, little bell, ringalingaling,
Ring, little bell, ring!
Girls, listen, and boys,
Open up the room for me,
I bring you many gifts,
You should enjoy them!
Ring, little bell, ringalingaling,
Ring, little bell, ring!

Ring, little bell, ringalingaling,
Ring, little bell, ring!
Brightly glow the candles,
Open your hearts to me!
I want to live there happily,
Devout child, how blessed!
Ring, little bell, ringalingaling,
Ring, little bell, ring!

See also
 List of Christmas carols

References

External links 
 Lyrics and MIDI files, in German, ingeb.org

German-language Christmas carols
Christmas in Germany
19th-century songs
Year of song unknown